Paolo Garofalo (born 9 December 1963 in Enna) is an Italian politician.

Former member of the Italian Socialist Party, he joined the Democratic Party in 2007 and ran for Mayor of Enna at the 2010 Italian local elections. He won and served as mayor from June 2010 to June 2015.

See also
2010 Italian local elections
List of mayors of Enna

References

External links
 

1963 births
Living people
Mayors of places in Sicily
People from Enna
Democratic Party (Italy) politicians